This is an alphabetical list of songs written or co-written by the American songwriter Jeffrey Steele. His credits include several singles mainly recorded by country music artists. Among his compositions are the No. 1 Hot Country Songs hits "Brand New Girlfriend" by Steve Holy, "The Cowboy in Me" by Tim McGraw, "These Days," "What Hurts the Most," "Here" and "My Wish" by Rascal Flatts.

A
"Adaline" – Keith Anderson (Keith Anderson, Chris Wallin)
"Ain't It Just Like a Woman" – Tracy Byrd (Al Anderson)
"All I Know About Mexico" – Montgomery Gentry (Chris Wallin)
"All I'm Thinking About Is You" – Billy Ray Cyrus
"Already in Way Over My Heart" – Stephanie Beaumont (Wendy Waldman)
"And the Crowd Goes Wild" – Mark Wills, Jeffrey Steele, PBR Allstars (Craig Wiseman)

B
"Back There All the Time" – Drew Davis Band (Steve Robson)
"Bad Case of Missing You" – Jason Sellers, The Oak Ridge Boys (Al Anderson)
"Be a Man" – Pam Tillis (Chuck Jones)
"Big Deal" – LeAnn Rimes (Al Anderson)
"Bigger Fish to Fry" – Boy Howdy
"Born That Way" – Boy Howdy (Chris Farren)
"Brand New Girlfriend" – Steve Holy (Shane Minor, Bart Allmand)
"Break My Heart" – Keith Anderson (Keith Anderson, Bob DiPiero)
"Burn" – Drew Davis Band (Bart Allmand)

C
"Chrome" – Trace Adkins (Anthony Smith)
"Circles" – Jana Kramer (Alyssa Bonagura, Brandon Hood)
"Closer" – Mark Wills (Bart Allmand)
"Clouds" – Montgomery Gentry (Eddie Montgomery, Tony Mullins)
"Come On, Come On" – Boy Howdy (Paul Marshall)
"A Cowboy's Born with a Broken Heart" – Boy Howdy (Chris Farren)
"The Cowboy in Me" – Tim McGraw (Craig Wiseman, Al Anderson)
"Couldn't Last a Moment" – Collin Raye (Danny Wells)
"Countrified" – Clay Walker, Halfway to Hazard (Kip Raines)
"Country Badass" – Cody McCarver (Bart Allmand, Tom Hambridge, Shane Minor)
"Cry, Cry, Cry" – Trick Pony (Ira Dean)

D

E
"Even If It Takes a Lifetime" – Adam Levy (Miles Zunega)
"Every Day" – Rascal Flatts (Alissa Moreno)
"Every Little Thing She Does" – Lonestar (Al Anderson, Bob DiPiero)
"Every Time I Hear Your Name" – Keith Anderson (Keith Anderson, Tom Hambridge)
"Everywhere I Go" – Phil Vassar (Phil Vassar)

F
"Flying By" – Billy Ray Cyrus (Joanna Smith, Tom Hambridge)
"Friend" – Van Zant (Tom Hambridge)

G
"Give It to Somebody" – Billy Ray Cyrus (Tom Hambridge)
"Gone" – Montgomery Gentry (Bob DiPiero)

H
"Half a Man" – Shannon Brown (Kent Blazy)
"The Hard Way" – Dusty Drake, Tom Waits (Al Anderson, Bob DiPiero)
"Hell Yeah" – Montgomery Gentry (Craig Wiseman)
"Hello L.O.V.E." – John Michael Montgomery (Danny Wells)
"Help Somebody" – Van Zant (Kip Raines)
"Her" – Aaron Tippin (Craig Wiseman)
"Here" – Rascal Flatts (Steve Robson)
"Here I Go Fallin'" – Diamond Rio (Chris Farren)
"Hey Country" – Victor Sanz, Montgomery Gentry (Bart Allmand, Danny Myrick)
"Hey Underdog" – Angus Gill & Seasons of Change (Angus Gill, Vicky McGehee, Providence David)
"Honey Do" – Keith Harling, Mike Walker (Al Anderson, Kent Blazy)
"How Far Do You Wanna Go?" – Gloriana (Danny Myrick, Matt Serletic)

I
"I Ain't Hurtin' Nobody but Me" – Keith Anderson (Keith Anderson, Vicky McGehee)
"I Believed" – Aaron Tippin
"I Can't Stop You" – Drew Davis Band (Danny Wells)
"I Hope You Find It" - Cher (Steve Robson)
"I Keep Coming Back" – Josh Gracin (Steve Robson)
"I Know My History" – Van Zant (Tom Hambridge, Johnny Van Zant, Donnie Van Zant)
"I Remember You" -Mountain Heart
"I Wanna Feel That Way Again" – Boy Howdy (John Hobbs, Chris Farren)
"I Luv Ya" – Billy Ray Cyrus (Michael Dulaney, John Hobbs)
"I'll Be Loving You" – Stephanie Beaumont (John Hobbs)
"I'll Be Right Here Lovin' You" – Rhett Akins, Randy Travis (T.W. Hale)
"I'll Know When I Get There" – Keith Anderson (Keith Anderson)
"I'm Tryin'" – Trace Adkins (Anthony Smith, Chris Wallin)
"I'm Trying to Find It" – Pat Green (Tom Hambridge)
"If That Ain't Country" – Anthony Smith (Anthony Smith)
"If This Is Love" – Boy Howdy (Chris Farren)
"If You Love Somebody" – Kevin Sharp (Chris Farren)
"Independent Trucker" – Brooks & Dunn (Chris Stapleton)
"International Harvester" – Craig Morgan (Shane Minor, Danny Myrick)
"I Thought I Lost You" - Miley Cyrus and John Travolta (Miley Cyrus)
"It's All About You" – Emerson Drive (Reed Nielsen)
"It's Only Love" – Jolie & the Wanted (Bekka Bramlett)
"I've Gotta Know" – Stephanie Beaumont (Rick Crawford)

J

K
"Knee Deep" – Zac Brown Band and Jimmy Buffett (Zac Brown, Coy Bowles, Wyatt Durrette)

L
"Last in a Long Lonesome Line" – Patty Loveless (Al Anderson, Bob DiPiero)
"Let's Bring It Back" – Lonestar (Annie Roboff)
"Let's Do Something About It" – Stephanie Beaumont (T.W. Hale)
"Little Breakdowns" – Carolyn Dawn Johnson (Carolyn Dawn Johnson)
"Look Me Up" – BR549 (Al Anderson)
"Love Is a Beautiful Thing" – Paul Brandt (as "It's a Beautiful Thing"), Phil Vassar (Craig Wiseman)
"Love Make a Fool of Me" – Al Anderson (Al Anderson, Bob DiPiero)
"A Love That Strong" – Paul Brandt (Reed Nielsen)
"Love Won't Let Me" – Victor Sanz, Jason Michael Carroll (Steve Robson)

M
"Me and My Gang" – Rascal Flatts (Tony Mullins, Jon Stone)
"Meanwhile Back at Mama's" – Tim McGraw (Tom Douglas, Jaren Johnston)
"My Greatest Love" – Stephanie Beaumont with Jeffrey Steele (Chris Farren, John Hobbs)
"My Life's Work" – Boy Howdy (Chris Farren)
"My Town" – Montgomery Gentry (Reed Nielsen)
"My Whiskey Years" – Joe Nichols (Tom Hambridge)
"My Wish" – Rascal Flatts (Steve Robson)

N
"Nothing Compares to Loving You" – Aaron Tippin, Michael Peterson (Craig Wiseman)
"Now" – Lonestar (Steve Robson)

O
"Once" – Rascal Flatts (John Shanks, Kara DioGuardi)
"Once a Cowboy" – Trick Pony (Bret Michaels, Shane Minor)
"The One That Got Away" – Boy Howdy (Walt Aldridge, Chris Farren)
"One Day" – Drew Davis Band (Craig Wiseman)
"Our Love Was Meant to Be" – Boy Howdy (Chris Farren)
"Outta This Town" – Chuck Cannon (Mac Davis, Chuck Cannon)

P
"Party on the Patio" – Jolie & the Wanted (Craig Wiseman)
"Plan B" – Boy Howdy (Chris Farren)
"Please" – Pam Tillis (John Hobbs, Michael Dulaney)
"Podunk" – Keith Anderson (Keith Anderson, Tom Hambridge)

Q

R
"Raise 'Em Up" - Keith Urban (Tom Douglas, Jaren Johnston)

S
"She Can't Love You" – Boy Howdy (Chris Farren, Randy Sharp)
"She Loved Me" – Montgomery Gentry (Craig Wiseman)
"She'd Give Anything" – Boy Howdy (Chris Farren, Vince Melamed)
"She's Gone" – Ricochet (John Hobbs, Michael Dulaney)
"The Shoebox" – Chris Young (Tom Hambridge)
"Shotgun Rider" – Tim McGraw (Anthony Smith, Sherrié Austin)
"Simple Song" – Miley Cyrus (Jesse Littleton)
"Something in the Water" – Little Feat, Jeffrey Steele (Al Anderson, Bob DiPiero)
"Something to Be Proud Of" – Montgomery Gentry (Chris Wallin)
"Something to Brag About" – Tracy Byrd (Al Anderson)
"Speed" – Montgomery Gentry (Chris Wallin)
"Stepped Right in It" – Kim Carnes (Al Anderson, Kim Carnes)
"Stick It" – Keith Anderson 
(Vicky McGehee, Keith Anderson)
"Stick That in Your Country Song" – Eric Church 
"The Strength to Love" – Kevin Sharp (Chris Farren, John Hobbs)
"Sunday Morning and Saturday Night" – James Otto (Tim Nichols)
"Sunday Morning in America" – Keith Anderson (Keith Anderson, Rivers Rutherford)
"Sweet Natural Girl" – Emerson Drive (Kip Raines, Craig Wiseman)

T
"Ten Years of Love" – Gurf Morlix (Gurf Morlix)
"That Moment" – Drew Davis Band (Steve Robson)
"That Would Be Her" – Joe Nichols (Reed Nielsen)
"That's the Kind of Man" – Boy Howdy (Chris Farren)
"Then I Did" – Rascal Flatts (Steve Robson)
"These Days" – Rascal Flatts (Steve Robson, Danny Wells)
"They Don't Make 'Em Like That Anymore" – Boy Howdy (Chris Farren)
"Things I Miss the Most" – Van Zant (Tom Hambridge, Donnie Van Zant, Johnny Van Zant)
"'Til the Heartache's Gone" – Diamond Rio (Al Anderson, John Hobbs)
"Tiny Life" - Danny Gokey (Marv Green)
"True to His Word" – Boy Howdy (Chris Farren, Gary Harrison)
"Twenty Years Ago" – Montgomery Gentry (Gary Nicholson, Rivers Rutherford)

U
"Unbelievable" – Diamond Rio (Al Anderson)

V

W
"The Wantin' Not the Gettin'" – Jolie & the Wanted (Al Anderson, Bob DiPiero)
"Wasted" – Jolie & the Wanted (Al Anderson)
"We Can Get Through This" – Kevin Sharp (Kim Carnes)
"We Can't Get Any Higher Than This" – Aaron Tippin (Ray Herndon)
"We're Makin' Up" – Hot Apple Pie (Al Anderson)
"Were You Lyin' Down?" – Gurf Morlix (Gurf Morlix)
"What Am I Waiting For" – Heidi Newfield (Keith Burns, Ira Dean, Heidi Newfield)
"What Hurts the Most" – Mark Wills, Jo O'Meara, Rascal Flatts, Cascada (Steve Robson), Aaron Lewis
"What If?" – Emerson Drive (Steve Robson)
"When the Lights Go Down" – Faith Hill (Craig Wiseman, Rivers Rutherford)
"Where Fools Are Kings" – Steve Wariner
"Who Says?" – Stephanie Beaumont (Scott Whitehead)
"Whoever Said That" – Stephanie Beaumont (Chris Farren, Chuck Jones)
"Will You Marry Me" – Alabama (Al Anderson)
"With You" – LeAnn Rimes (Steve Robson)
"Wouldn't Have To" – Fanny Grace (Paul Reeves)

X

Y
"You and Me and Love" – Stephanie Beaumont (Stephanie Beaumont)
"You're in My Head" – Brian McComas (Shane Minor, Chris Wallin)
"Your Tears Are Comin'" – Montgomery Gentry (Tom Hambridge)

Z

References
[ List of songs composed by Jeffrey Steele] at Allmusic

Steele, Jeffrey